Malik Saif ul Malook Khokhar is a Pakistani politician who was a Member of the Provincial Assembly of the Punjab, from 2010 to May 2018 and from August 2018 to January 2023.

Early life
He was born on 18 June 1967 in Lahore.

Political career

He was elected to the Provincial Assembly of the Punjab as a candidate of Pakistan Muslim League (N) (PML-N) from Constituency PP-160 (Lahore-XXIV) in by-polls held in June 2010. He received 27,798 votes and defeated Malik Zaheer Abbas Khokhar, a candidate of Pakistan Tehreek-e-Insaf (PTI).

He was re-elected to the Provincial Assembly of the Punjab as a candidate of PML-N from Constituency PP-160 (Lahore-XXIV) in 2013 Pakistani general election. He received 71,677 votes and defeated Malik Zaheer Abbas Khokhar, a candidate of PTI.

He was re-elected to the Provincial Assembly of the Punjab as a candidate of PML-N from Constituency PP-165 (Lahore-XXII) in by-election held on 14 October 2018.
Recently, he was all over the news because of the demolition of Khokhar Palace, the family house of Khokhar Brothers.

References

Living people
Punjab MPAs 2013–2018
1967 births
Pakistan Muslim League (N) MPAs (Punjab)
Punjab MPAs 2008–2013